Ashley Avis (born January 27, 1987) is an American screenwriter, director, editor, and producer.  Her credits include the feature films Deserted (2016), Adolescence (2018), and Black Beauty (2020) starring Kate Winslet and Mackenzie Foy.

Early life 
Avis was born in Chicago, Illinois to Richard Avis and Victoria Woods. She has one younger brother, Richard Avis. At five years old, Avis' family relocated from Chicago to St. Petersburg, Florida where Avis grew up. She was a competitive equestrian from the age of seven to seventeen, competing on the hunter/jumper circuit in Florida. In 2003, Avis traveled to Ghana, West Africa for the Model of the Universe pageant, winning the title of Miss Teen Model of the Universe.

Avis has expressed that she always wanted to become a writer, and thought she would eventually become a young adult author or novelist. She attended college in New York, double majoring in International Business and Marketing at Manhattan College in Riverdale, and graduated in three years in 2008. She worked as a real estate agent, a web designer, and at Nielsen Media as a journalist, eventually being promoted to the regional editor during her college years. After trying theater in Manhattan, she became attracted to writing screenplays.

Career 
In 2009, Avis relocated from New York to Los Angeles, California, saving up money to produce her first pilot for a series called The Cynical Life. Because she didn't have the funds to hire a producer or a director, she took on those roles herself. The project caught the attention of Lionsgate founder Frank Giustra, who executive produced three episodes. From there, Avis directed and produced the classical music documentary Opus X, featuring Lone Madsen and Caroline Campbell.

Avis formed her production company Alchemy Pictures in 2010, and began directing and producing branded commercial content, eventually landing clients such as Mercedes-Benz, Coca-Cola, Red Bull, Pfizer, and the Cali Group. She wrote and directed multiple spots for technology client Miso Robotics featuring the AI robot "Flippy", which has garnered over 1 billion impressions to date, and has been featured on websites such as Forbes, TechCrunch, and The Wall Street Journal.

In 2015, Avis made her directorial debut with the psychological thriller Deserted, starring Mischa Barton, Winter Ave Zoli, Trent Ford, Jake Busey, andJackson Davis. She wrote the original screenplay and also produced the film, which was edited by Douglas Crise. In 2016, she directed her second feature, the coming of age story Adolescence, starring India Eisley, Elisabeth Rohm, Tommy Flanagan and Jere Burns. The film also features the original music of Zac Brown Band member John Driskell Hopkins. 

In 2016, Avis traveled to Cape Town, South Africa for the Bokeh South African International Film Festival, where she won the Mercedes-Benz award for her film Bespoke..  In 2018 she worked with Oscar winner Cloris Leachman, Betsy Brandt, and Sascha Nastasi on Being and Nothingness, and in 2019 embarked on a feature length documentary project that would eventually span five years, Wild Beauty: Mustang Spirit of the West.

In 2020, Avis wrote, directed, and edited Black Beauty for Disney+ and Constantin Film based on Anna Sewell's classic novel starring Oscar Winner Kate Winslet, Mackenzie Foy, and Iain Glenn.  The film was reviewed as a "gorgeous, sweeping epic" by Richard Roeper of the Chicago Sun-Times. 

From 2022 through 2023, Avis' documentary Wild Beauty: Mustang Spirit of the West debuted on the film festival circuit, aimed to raise awareness for the eradication of wild horses across Western public lands.  Wild Beauty premiered at the Breckenridge Film Festival in 2022, a screening attended by Colorado Governor Jared Polis, First Gentleman Marlon Reis, and their children.  In March 2015, Wild Beauty debuted in Las Vegas, where Avis was honored by Congresswoman Dina Titus with a Special Congressional Commendation award for her work on behalf of equine conservation efforts.  The Clark County Commissioner's office declared March 15th, 2023 "Wild Beauty Day".

Wild Beauty: Mustang Spirit of the West, which has been called "groundbreaking" and "poignant and important" has won several awards on the film festival circuit, including "Best Documentary" at the 2022 Boston Film Festival, The Joe Williams award for "Best Documentary" at the 2022 St. Louis International Film Festival, "Best Director" and "Best Cinematography" at 2022 DOCLA.

Philanthropy 
Following her feature film Black Beauty, Avis formed the California based 501c3 nonprofit The Wild Beauty Foundation; with a mission of rescuing wild and domestic horses in need, along with raising awareness through film and educational programs for children.  

In 2021, she launched "A Day With a Horse" for the patients of St. Jude Children's Research Hospital, and has spoken to children across the country to encourage them to protect the environment, including writing letters to their Members of Congress on behalf of wild horses. In 2022, a wild horse horse Avis rescued from the slaughter pipeline was adopted by Black Beauty star Mackenzie Foy, who is also an Ambassador for the foundation.

Personal life 
In 2013, Avis met her future husband and producing partner Edward Winters. They became engaged in 2014 in Cape Town, South Africa, and were married on June 6, 2015.

Filmography

References

External links

1987 births
Living people
American women screenwriters
American women film directors
People from Chicago
People from St. Petersburg, Florida
21st-century American women